The 1926–27 İstanbul Football League season was the 20th season of the league. Galatasaray SK won the league for the 9th time.

Season

References

 Tuncay, Bülent (2002). Galatasaray Tarihi. Yapı Kredi Yayınları 
 Dağlaroğlu, Rüştü. Fenerbahçe Spor Kulübü Tarihi 1907-1957

Istanbul Football League seasons
Turk
Istanbul